Úrvalsdeild karla, also known as Olís deild karla for sponsorship reasons, is the highest men's handball competition among clubs in Iceland, where play determines the national champion. It is managed by the Icelandic Handball Association. Started in 1939, the Úrvalsdeild karla is the third-oldest national indoor handball championship in the world, after the Danish and Swedish championships which were started in 1935 and 1931 respectively. With 23 titles won so far, Valur is the record champion, while Haukar are holding a world record for enduring the longest time gap between two national titles with 57 years passing between their first win in 1943 and their second (of 11 in total so far) in 2000.

FH won the title in 2011 after a win against Akureyri Handboltafélag in front of a record crowd of 2950 people in Kaplakriki.

2019/20 Season participants  

The following 12 clubs compete in the Olís deild karla during the 2019–20 season.

Úrvalsdeild karla past champions 

 1940 : Valur
 1941 : Valur (2)
 1942 : Valur (3)
 1943 : Haukar
 1944 : Valur (4)
 1945 : Ármann
 1946 : ÍR Reykjavik
 1947 : Valur (5)
 1948 : Valur (6)
 1949 : Ármann (2)
 1950 : Fram
 1951 : Valur (7)
 1952 : Ármann (3)
 1953 : Ármann (4)
 1954 : Ármann (5)
 1955 : Valur (8)
 1956 : Fimleikafélag Hafnarfjarðar
 1957 : Fimleikafélag Hafnarfjarðar (2)
 1958 : KR Reykjavik
 1959 : Fimleikafélag Hafnarfjarðar (3)
 1960 : Fimleikafélag Hafnarfjarðar (4)
 1961 : Fimleikafélag Hafnarfjarðar (5)
 1962 : Fram (2)
 1963 : Fram (3)
 1964 : Fram (4)
 1965 : Fimleikafélag Hafnarfjarðar (6)
 1966 : Fimleikafélag Hafnarfjarðar (7)
 1967 : Fram (5)
 1968 : Fram (6)
 1969 : Fimleikafélag Hafnarfjarðar (8)
 1970 : Fram (7)
 1971 : Fimleikafélag Hafnarfjarðar (9)
 1972 : Fram (8)
 1973 : Valur (9)
 1974 : Fimleikafélag Hafnarfjarðar (10)
 1975 : Víkingur Reykjavik
 1976 : Fimleikafélag Hafnarfjarðar (11)
 1977 : Valur (10)
 1978 : Valur (11)
 1979 : Valur (12)
 1980 : Víkingur Reykjavik (2)
 1981 : Víkingur Reykjavik (3)
 1982 : Víkingur Reykjavik (4)
 1983 : Víkingur Reykjavik (5)
 1984 : Fimleikafélag Hafnarfjarðar (12)
 1985 : Fimleikafélag Hafnarfjarðar (13)
 1986 : Víkingur Reykjavik (6)
 1987 : Víkingur Reykjavik (7)
 1988 : Valur (13)
 1989 : Valur (14)
 1990 : Fimleikafélag Hafnarfjarðar (14)
 1991 : Valur (15)
 1992 : Fimleikafélag Hafnarfjarðar (15)
 1993 : Valur (16)
 1994 : Valur (17)
 1995 : Valur (18)
 1996 : Valur (19)
 1997 : KA Akureyri
 1998 : Valur (20)
 1999 : UMF Afturelding
 2000 : Haukar (2)
 2001 : Haukar (3)
 2002 : KA Akureyri(2)
 2003 : Haukar (4)
 2004 : Haukar (5)
 2005 : Haukar (6)
 2006 : Fram (9)
 2007 : Valur (21)
 2008 : Haukar (7)
 2009 : Haukar (8)
 2010 : Haukar (9)
 2011 : Fimleikafélag Hafnarfjarðar (16) 
 2012 : HK Kópavogur
 2013 : Fram (10)
 2014 : ÍBV Vestmannaeyjar
 2015 : Haukar (10)
 2016 : Haukar (11)
 2017 : Valur (22)
 2018 : ÍBV Vestmannaeyjar (2)
 2019 : Selfoss
 2020 : Not awarded due to the COVID-19 pandemic
 2021 : Valur (23)

EHF coefficient ranking

For season 2018/2019, see footnote

18.  (23)  Eredivisie (14,25)
19.  (18)  Rukometna liga Srbije (13,44)
20.  (27)  Úrvalsdeld karla (12.67)
21.  (19)  Extraliga (12,57)
22.  (20)  Extraliga (12,56)

Seasonal Coefficient Ranking Graph.:

See also
Úrvalsdeild karla (disambiguation)
Úrvalsdeild kvenna (handball), the women's handball league

External links 
 Úrvalsdeild karla 2017-2018

References

Ice
Handball leagues in Iceland
Professional sports leagues in Iceland